BPER Banca S.p.A., formerly known as Banca Popolare dell'Emilia Romagna S.C., is an Italian banking group offering traditional banking services to individuals, corporate and public entities. The company is based in Modena and is a constituent of the FTSE MIB index.

The bank had branches in most of Italy, but not in Aosta Valley and Friuli – Venezia Giulia. The bank is a majority shareholder of Piedmontese bank Cassa di Risparmio di Bra and Saluzzo, as well as minority shareholders of Fossano and Savigliano.

History
Banca Popolare dell'Emilia was formed by  the merger of Banca Popolare di Modena (found 1867) with Banca Cooperativa di Bologna on 29 December 1983. The bank merged with Banca Popolare di Cesena to form Banca Popolare dell'Emilia Romagna on 1 May 1992. The bank acquired and absorbed many provincial and regional-level Popular Banks and Savings Banks from the 1990s to the 2010s.

2000s
 2005 Cassa di Risparmio di Vignola was privatized for about €33 million. The remaining 23.913% of shares were sold by the banking foundation.
 2006 The minority interests in Cassa di Risparmio di Bra, Fossano, Saluzzo and Savigliano were acquired from UniCredit for about €149 million.

2010s
In February 2013, BPER acquired an additional 35.98% stake of CR Bra S.p.A. from the banking foundation of CR Bra for around €23.9 million. After the deal BPER owned 67% stake.

The bank was affected by Decree-Law N°3 of 2015, which required banks with assets more than €8 billion to transform from Cooperative societies (S.C.) to Società per Azioni (from one person one vote to one share one vote).

In 2016 the controlling stake in Cassa di Risparmio di Saluzzo was acquired from the banking foundation of CR Saluzzo. On 14 July 2016 a gross value of €450 million bad loans (the most doubtful non-performing loans) were sold to Algebris NPL Fund and Cerberus European Investments without recourse. Italian banks had the highest gross NPLs to total loan ratio in the European Union (18% at 31 December 2015); BPER Group's gross NPLs to total loan ratio was 23.28% at 31 December 2015, or €11.395 billion in size in gross; Banco di Sardegna along had €2 billion as well as highest ratio among the group.

In late 2016 the bank was re-incorporated as BPER Banca S.p.A., as part of the mandatory process, the bank offered to buy back the shares for €3.8070, based on historical price of the bank. However, no share was repurchased, and the market value of the bank in the Borsa returned to above that price.

On 2 March 2017 BPER Banca signed a contract to acquire Nuova Cassa di Risparmio di Ferrara for a nominal fee of €1. On 30 June the deal was completed.

In February 2019, BPER Banca announced the acquisition of Unipol Banca from Unipol and UnipolSai. The takeover was completed in July 2019 and on 25 November 2019 Unipol Banca was incorporated into BPER Banca.

In 2020, BPER entered into an agreement with Intesa Sanpaolo to acquire 532  branches the latter will have to shed as a result of regulatory obligations resulting from its successful acquisition of rival UBI Banca.

In February 2022, BPER Banca acquired Banca Carige.

Former subsidiaries

ABF Factoring (2004–2010)
Banca della Campania (2003–2014)
Banca del Monte di Foggia (1998–2006)
Banca Popolare di Aprilia (1998–?)
Banca Popolare di Castrovillari e Corigliano Calabro (1999–?)
Banca Popolare di Crotone (?–2008)
Banca Popolare dell'Irpinia (2000–2013)
Banca Popolare di Lanciano e Sulmona (?–2003)
Banca Popolare del Materano (?–2008)
Banca Popolare del Mezzogiorno (2008–2014)
Banca Popolare di Salerno (?–2003)
Banca Popolare di Sinni (1998–?)
Banca Popolare di Ravenna (?–2014)
Meliorbanca (?–2012)
Cassa di Risparmio della Provincia dell'Aquila (1999–2013)
Cassa di Risparmio di Vignola (?–2010)
Credito Commerciale Tirreno (1997–2003)
Eurobanca del Trentino (2004–2010)
Nuova Cassa di Risparmio di Ferrara (2017–2017)

Equity interests
 ARCA SGR (32.752%)
 Cassa di Risparmio di Fossano (23.077%)
 Banca Cassa di Risparmio di Savigliano (31.006%)

Shareholders
Due to issuing new shares in the acquisitions of some banks, some banking foundations were shareholders of the bank, namely Fondazione Banco di Sardegna (3.021%), Fondazione Carispaq (0.58%), Fondazione Monte Foggia (0.06%), Fondazione di Vignola (0.00%).

Norges Bank also owned 2.062% shares.
UnipolSai owns about 20% of the capital.

See also

 Art collection of Banca Popolare dell'Emilia Romagna

References

External links
 

 
Banks of Italy
Companies based in Modena
Banks established in 1983
Former cooperative banks of Italy
Italian companies established in 1983
Banks under direct supervision of the European Central Bank